John Williams Andrews (November 10, 1898 – March 18, 1975) was a journalist, public relations professional, poet and author of non-fiction.

Andrews was born in Bryn Mawr, Pennsylvania on November 10, 1898, to Evangeline Holcombe Walker and noted historian Charles McLean Andrews. During his journalistic career he worked for Chung Mei in China before joining the Connecticut-based New Haven Journal-Courier. After Yale Law School and acceptance to the New York State bar, he began practicing with the law firm Root, Clark Buckner & Ballentine before leaving to write History of the founding of Wolf's Head, and then became involved in the publication of poetry journals. In 1936, he wrote Prelude to 'Icaros', designed as the introduction to an epic about Charles Lindbergh's transatlantic flight.

In 1940 he joined the United States Justice Department as chief of the Federal-State Relations Section, and later as a trial attorney in the Antitrust Division.

He was director of the Washington Institute of Mental Health in 1951, then joined the public relations firm Hill & Knowlton before forming his own firm, Andrews Associaresm Inc., and retiring from the field in 1962.

In 1963 he was co-recipient of the Robert Frost Poetry Award, and edited Literary Quarterly and Poet Lore.

References

Poets from Pennsylvania
American newspaper journalists
1975 deaths
1898 births
20th-century American poets
American male poets
20th-century American male writers
20th-century American non-fiction writers
American male non-fiction writers
American expatriates in China